Alisha's Attic were an English pop duo of the 1990s and early 2000s. The two members were sisters Shelly and Karen Poole, born in Barking and Chadwell Heath respectively. Their father is Brian Poole of 1960s group Brian Poole and the Tremeloes.

History
Karen and Shelly released their first single, "Sugar Daddy", as Keren & Chelle [sic] in 1988, but it failed to chart. Their chart career began with the release of their debut single "I Am, I Feel", which quickly became a radio and chart hit in the UK. This was followed in November 1996 by their entirely self-written debut album Alisha Rules the World. The platinum selling album was produced by Dave Stewart of the Eurythmics and spawned four top 15 UK hits and substantial success in Europe and Japan.
They were nominated for a 1997 Brit Award for Best Newcomer, and also nominated that year for an Ivor Novello Award for the best lyrical and melodic composition. In July 1997, the band played at the first Lilith Fair festival.
They also toured with INXS, and supported Jon Bon Jovi as well as their own headline tours throughout the late nineties.

Alisha's Attic went on to release two more albums, Illumina (silver in the UK) which produced the singles "The Incidentals", "Wish I Were You" and "Barbarella", and the critically acclaimed album The House We Built, a mostly live album recorded with Bill Bottrell in Mendocino, USA. The two singles from this album were "Pretender Got My Heart" (which was featured in the film Bridget Jones's Diary) and "Push It All Aside". Both of these singles featured videos made by Sophie Muller. The group released one more album in Japan - Japanese Dream - before they went their separate ways in 2004.

Both members went on to become successful songwriters, writing for artists such as Kylie Minogue, Dannii Minogue, Will Young and Sugababes. Shelly is also in the band Red Sky July.

Discography

Studio albums

Compilation albums

Singles

Other songs
 A cover version of Suede's "Still Life" for the 1996 charity album by ChildLine.
 A cover of The Crystals' "He's a Rebel" for the 1997 film Bean.

References

External links
 Official Alisha's Attic website (offline)
 

Sibling musical duos
English pop music duos
English pop girl groups
Female musical duos
Musical groups established in 1996
Musical groups disestablished in 2001
Musical groups from London
Universal Records artists
Mercury Records artists
1996 establishments in England
2001 disestablishments in England